The M139 is a turbocharged inline-four engine produced by Mercedes-Benz. It is the successor of the M133 engine. It is also the first four-cylinder engine by AMG to be specified with two outputs, to be assembled by hand using "one man, one engine" philosophy, and to be equipped with combined port and direct fuel injection system. At  on its introduction, M139 is the world's most powerful four-cylinder engine in serial production with specific output of 208 hp per litre or 104 hp per cylinder.

Design 

The M139 engine is based on the current Mercedes-Benz M260 engine, which is an upgraded version of the outgoing M270, sharing the same bore and stroke dimension as well as the block. Unlike the normal M260, the AMG engineers rotated the engine block 180 degrees so that the intake system is in the front of the engine while the turbochargers and exhaust headers are situated between the engine and firewall. The rotation optimises the air flow for higher performance and with shorter distance and fewer diversions. This also leads to the "allows the flattest possible and aerodynamically advantageous front section design." The exhaust valves in M139 engine are bigger than ones in M133 engines for higher flow. The compression ratio is raised to 9.0:1 for M139 from 8.6:1 for M133. The two-stage fuel injection system, a first in AMG four-cylinder engine, has the piezo injectors delivering the fuel directly into the combustion chambers as first stage and solenoid valves in the manifolds as second stage for increased specific output.

An electrically-assisted turbocharger system by Garrett Motion is used.

Performance 

Models

M139 (285 kW version) 
2019 - Mercedes CLA (C118) 45 AMG 4MATIC+
2020 - Mercedes A-Class (W177) 45 AMG 4MATIC+
2021 - Mercedes GLA 45 AMG 4MATIC+
2022 - Mercedes-AMG SL 43 (will use 280 kW / 375 hp version)
2023 - Lotus Emira (will use 268 kW / 360 hp version)

M139 (300 kW version) 
2023 - Mercedes-AMG C43 4MATIC

M139 (310 kW version) 
2020 - Mercedes CLA (C118) 45 S AMG 4MATIC+
2020 - Mercedes A-Class (W177) 45 S AMG 4MATIC+
2021 - Mercedes GLA 45 S AMG 4MATIC+

M139 (350 kW version) 
2022 - Mercedes-AMG C 63 S E Performance 4MATIC+

References 

Mercedes-Benz engines
Straight-four engines
Gasoline engines by model